Jean-Marc Jurkovitz (born 20 April 1963) is a French volleyball player. He competed in the men's tournament at the 1988 Summer Olympics.

References

1963 births
Living people
French men's volleyball players
Olympic volleyball players of France
Volleyball players at the 1988 Summer Olympics
Volleyball players from Paris